Bhola Government College is a government educational institution located in the area adjacent to Yugirghol, Bhola-Char Fashion Road in Bhola city. It was established in 1962, the college is the oldest school in Bhola District. form.

Nationalized in 1989, the institute is spreading the light of knowledge in the island district by making continuous efforts for quality modern and up-to-date education in the light of "National Education Policy-2010". In this college higher secondary and undergraduate level educational activities are conducted. The college is surrounded by beautiful and captivating natural environment. This college is affiliated to Bangladesh National University.

Establishment background
With the aim of developing the backward population of Bhola, the largest island of Bangladesh, the then Deputy Commissioner Abdul Aziz and some enthusiastic people started Bhola College on 15 September 1982 with the Department of Science, Commerce and Humanities. Degree (pass) courses were introduced in the college in the academic year 1983–84.

The college was nationalized on May 7, 1989. The first phase of the college was established in 1962 at the present Abdur Rab Secondary School. After that, the activities of the college were fully started by constructing a tin shed house on the land purchased in the name of the college. In 1978, the construction work of the brick building was started and later the brick building was renovated to its present form.

Campus

Academic building

Student accommodation

The college has two dormitories named 'Shahbazkhan Hostel' and 'Poet Nazrul Islam Hostel'. In addition, two new dormitories with 500 beds are under construction. The dormitories are run under the supervision of the Housing and Dormitory Committee. There is also a 20-bed dormitory for students.

Field
Inside the college is a huge historic college grounds. Different divisional level sports are held here.

Library
The library of Bhola Government College is one of the oldest libraries in the Barisal division. The college has a central and 16 departmental seminar library. The Central Library has 15,616 and the departmental seminar libraries have about 20,000 books. The college library also has daily, weekly, fortnightly and monthly magazines for the students.

Faculties and Departments

Department of Bangla language and literature
Department of English language and literature
Department of History and Culture of Islam
 Department of History
Department of Economics
Department of Political Science
Department of Social Work
Department of Mathematics
Department of Philosophy
Department of Physics
Department of Chemistry
Department of Botany
Department of Zoology
Department of Accounting Science
Department of Management
Department of Geography and Environment
Department of Soil Science
Department of Islamic Education
Department of Information and Communication Technology

Other infrastructural facilities

There is 1 mosque in the college.
There are separate auditoriums for male and female students.
The college has arrangements for joining and training in the army branch of the Bangladesh National Cadet Corps.
Rover Scout and Youth Red Crescent activities are underway.
Canteen
Bicycle garage
Shaheed Minar
Science Lab
Science Club
Debate Club
Botanical Garden

See also
Char Fasson Govt. College

References

Universities and colleges in Bhola District
1962 establishments in East Pakistan